Documentary Channel was a digital television channel in New Zealand. Documentary Channel launched in 2007, and was available via SKY TV on channel 074.

Concept
The channel airs documentary programming. The channel features documentaries from independent companies based in New Zealand while also featuring documentaries from different global media organisation.

Closure
On 8 December 2010, it was announced that the independent owners of the Documentary Channel have sold the channel to BBC Worldwide. The channel was replaced by BBC Knowledge New Zealand in March 2011. It continued to broadcast content culturally and socially relevant to the country.

References

External links
 "Documentary Channel" Official Site
 "SKY TV"  Official Site 

Defunct television channels in New Zealand
Documentary television channels
Television channels and stations established in 2007
Television channels and stations disestablished in 2011